The governor of Malta was an official who ruled Malta during the British colonial period between 1813 and 1964. This office replaced that of the civil commissioner. Upon the end of British rule and the creation of the State of Malta in 1964, this office was replaced by the governor-general, who represented the British monarch and not the government of the United Kingdom as did the governor. The office of Governor-General was itself abolished in 1974 and replaced by the post of president when Malta became a republic.

The governor
The governor, appointed by the British monarch (on the advice of the prime minister), maintained executive power in Malta throughout British rule. He was head of the executive council and the pre-independence government of Malta.

The governor was the most powerful official in Malta.

The governor was initially supported by a lieutenant-governor. For example, from ca.1813 to ca.1820, Major-General Sir William Hutchinson served as lieutenant governor. After the death of the Marquess of Hastings in 1826, the British government decided to downgrade the post of Governor to Lieutenant-Governor, with a reduced allowance. Sir Frederick Ponsonby was formally designated Lieutenant-Governor and Commander of the Malta Garrison.

List of governors (1801–1964)

Lieutenant governors of Malta

Public Secretary
 Arthur Baynes 1801 
 Alexander Macauley 1801 
 Samuel Taylor Coleridge 1804–1805 
 E.F. Chapman 1805 
 Rev. Francis Laing 1811–1813

Chief Secretary
 Rev. Francis Laing 1813–1815 
 Alexander Wood 1815–1817 
 Richard Plasket 1817–1824 
 Colonel Sir Frederick Hankey 1824–1837 
 Sir Hector Greig 1837–1847 
 Henry Lushington 1847–1855 
 Sir Victor Houlton 1855–1883 
 Sir Walter Hely-Hutchinson 1883–1884

Lieutenant Governor
Sir Walter Hely-Hutchinson 1884–1889 (as Lieutenant Governor)
Sir Gerald Strickland 1889–1902 (as Chief Secretary)
Sir Edward Marsh Merewether 1902–1910 (as Lieutenant Governor and Chief Secretary)

Chief Secretary
 Major John Eugene Clauson 1911–1914 
 Horace Archer Byatt 1914–1916 
 Sir William C. F. Robertson 1917–1925 
 Sir Thomas Alexander Vans Best 1925–1930 
 Sir Harry Charles Luke 1930–1938 
 John Adams Hunter 1938–1940 
 Sir Edward St. John Jackson 1940–1943 
 Sir David Campbell 1943–1952 
 Trafford Smith 1952–1959
 Archibald Campbell 1959–1962

Flag of the Governor

References

.
Crown Colony of Malta
Malta
Governors
.